"To the Door of the Sun (Alle porte del sole)" is a 1975 hit single by Al Martino and the title track of his LP.

It is the English version of an Italian-language song by Gigliola Cinquetti, "Alle porte del sole", which was released in 1973. Cinquetti had later recorded an English rendition of it, different from Martino's, which was released as a single by CBS Records in August 1974 with her original Italian version on the B-side. The record reached number six in South Africa.

Chart history
In early 1975, "To the Door of the Sun" reached number 17 on the U.S. Billboard Hot 100.  It spent four months on the chart, equaling the chart run length of Martino's greatest hit, "I Love You Because" (#3, 1963).

"To the Door of the Sun" was a bigger Adult Contemporary hit, reaching number seven on the AC charts of both the United States and Canada.  The song also charted in Australia.

Al Martino version

Weekly charts

Year-end charts

Gigliola Cinquetti version

References

External links
 Lyrics of this song
 

1973 songs
1974 singles
Gigliola Cinquetti songs
Al Martino songs
Capitol Records singles
Macaronic songs
Songs with lyrics by Norman Newell
Songs written by Daniele Pace
Songs written by Mario Panzeri

Number-one singles in Argentina